Turtle soup, also known as terrapin soup, is a soup or stew made from the meat of turtles. Differing versions of the soup exist in some cultures and are viewed as a delicacy.

Versions

China 
In China, and in several countries in Southeast Asia such as Singapore, turtle soup is a delicacy. The meat, skin and innards of the turtle are used in the soup. Soft-shelled turtles such as Pelodiscus sinensis are commonly consumed in this manner in Chinese cuisine, while consumption of hard-shelled turtles is often avoided due to their mythical connotations.  However, the hard shells of certain turtles are used in the preparation of a dish called Guilinggao or "turtle jelly".

England 
Turtle soup gained popularity in England in the 1750s but declined rapidly about 150 years later due to overfishing. According to food historian Janet Clarkson, the dish, which she describes as one of several "noteworthy soups",  became a symbol for civic dinners and 

Green sea turtle first became popular in England as "sea-tortoise" circa 1728: "Its Flesh is between that of Veal, and that of a Lobster, and is extremely pleasant ... They are frequently brought to England in Tubs of Sea Water, and will keep alive a long time." The earliest English recipes are for roast or boiled turtle, only later being used in a soup. About 1740–1750, it began to be widely imported to England, from Ascension Island or the West Indies. Samuel Birch is credited with being the first to serve turtle soup in London, spicing it with lemons and cayennes; it quickly became immensely popular, and Lord Dudley stated, "Of British soup, turtle always takes precedence in the list of honour". Giles Rose made turtle soup as follows: "Take your tortoises and cut off their heads and feet and boyl them in fair water, and when they are almost boyl'd, put to them some white wine, some sweet herbs, and a piece of bacon, and give them a brown in the frying pan with good butter, then lay upon your bread a-steeping in good strong broth, and well-seasoned; garnish the dish with green sparrow-grass [asparagus] and lemon over it." In Cookery and Domestic Economy (1862), the recipe begins as follows: "take the turtle out of the water, turn it on its back, tie its feet, cut off its head".

According to Clarkson, "It is difficult to overestimate the magnitude of the demand for turtles" during the period of the soup's popularity. As many as 15,000 turtles were shipped live to Britain from the West Indies. Because of its popularity, the green turtle population plummeted, and its cost rose correspondingly. Isabella Beeton noted in 1861, "This is the most expensive soup brought to the table". Thus, long before that time, mock turtle soup made from calf's head was widely adopted as a more economical substitute and became popular in its own right, with the two dishes sometimes being served at the same banquet.

United States 
In the United States, the common snapping turtle has long been the principal species used for turtle soup. In this case the soup is also referred to as snapper turtle soup, or simply snapper soup (not to be confused with red snapper soup, which is made from the fish red snapper). It is a heavy, brown soup with an appearance similar to thick meat gravy.

In the Chesapeake Bay, the diamondback terrapin was the species exploited in a turtle soup "fishery". Canneries processed and exported tons of product until the turtle populations collapsed. Similarly in the San Francisco Bay, the Pacific pond turtle was the base of a minor industry with the canned product sent to eastern markets by rail.  

, various dishes made using turtle, including turtle soup, were served by a restaurant in Minnesota, mostly during Lent. The owner said that it was primarily older customers who have previously eaten turtle who order the turtle dishes; younger diners are much less interested.

The 27th U.S. president, William Howard Taft, hired a chef at the White House for the specific purpose of preparing turtle soup.

Poisoning 
Eating the flesh of some marine turtles can cause a rare, but possibly lethal, type of food poisoning called chelonitoxism.

See also 
 Turtle farming

References

External links 

 Asian Turtle Crisis

 

Soups
Turtle dishes